The 2019 Liga 3 Southeast Sulawesi is the third edition of Liga 3 (formerly known as Liga Nusantara) Southeast Sulawesi as a qualifying round for the national round of 2019 Liga 3. PS Wonua Bombana, winner of the 2018 Liga 3 Southeast Sulawesi are the defending champions. The competition began on 15 August 2019.

Format
In this competition, 14 teams are divided into 4 groups of three or four. The winner will represent Southeast Sulawesi in the national round of 2019 Liga 3.

Teams
There are 14 clubs which will participate the league in this season.

Group stage
This stage started on 15 August 2019.

Group A

Group B

Group C

Group D

Knockout stage

References

2019 in Indonesian football